Jack Kahane (20 July 1887, in Manchester – 2 September 1939, in Paris) was a writer and publisher who founded the Obelisk Press in Paris in 1929.

He was the son of Selig and Susy Kahane, both immigrants from Romania. Kahane, a novelist, began the Obelisk Press after his publisher, Grant Richards, went bankrupt. Going into partnership with a printer — Herbert Clarke, owner of Imprimerie Vendôme — Kahane published his next novel Daffodil under his own imprint, and under one of several pseudonyms he used, Cecil Barr. A publisher of "dbs" ("dirty books"), Kahane mixed serious work with smut in his list; he was able to take advantage of a legal hiatus whereby English-language books published in France were not subject there to the censorship otherwise effectively practised in the UK and elsewhere, though they remained potentially subject to confiscation when they were imported into English-speaking countries.

The Obelisk Press published Henry Miller's Tropic of Cancer and other works that other publishers would not touch for fear of prosecution, among which were Lady Chatterley's Lover, James Hanley's Boy and some of James Joyce's books.

Jack Kahane was the father of Maurice Girodias, who created the Olympia Press.

Further reading
Neil Pearson Obelisk: A History of Jack Kahane and the Obelisk Press, 2007, Liverpool University Press
 Gary Miers Of Obelisks and Daffodils: The Publishing History of the Obelisk Press (1929–1939), 2011, Handsack Press.
 Jack Kahane. Memoirs of a Booklegger, 1939, William Brendon & Son.

References

External links

Jack Kahane family documents
 

1887 births
1939 deaths
English Jews
English writers
English publishers (people)
English people of Romanian-Jewish descent
French people of Romanian-Jewish descent
English pornographers
British expatriates in France
20th-century English male writers
20th-century English businesspeople